Jorun Askersrud, later Nygaard, also married Tangen (6 May 1929 – 12 October 2012) was a Norwegian cross-country skier and track and field athlete during the 1950s.

She was born in Lunner, and represented the clubs Lunner IL and IL i BUL. In 1952 she finished 12th in the 10 km cross-country event at the Winter Olympics in Oslo and competed without reaching the final in 100 metres and 80 metres hurdles at the Summer Olympics. Norway had originally opposed cross-country skiing for women at their own 1952 Winter Olympics.

She finished 17 in the pentathlon at both the 1954 European Championships and the 1958 European Championships. Her personal best times in her athletic Olympic events were 12.2 seconds and 11.8 seconds, respectively. In Norwegian championships she won 39 gold medals, 16 silver and 11 bronze medals as well as 9 relay gold medals between 1949 and 1961. She was awarded the King's Cup in 1953, the Norwegian Athletics Association Gold Medal in 1958 and became an honorary member of IL i BUL in 1963.

As a speed skater she entered the Norwegian Allround Championships in 1958, winning the silver medal.

Cross-country skiing results

Olympic Games

References

External links 
 

1929 births
2012 deaths
People from Lunner
Norwegian female cross-country skiers
Olympic cross-country skiers of Norway
Cross-country skiers at the 1952 Winter Olympics
Norwegian female sprinters
Norwegian female hurdlers
Norwegian female long jumpers
Norwegian female shot putters
Norwegian female discus throwers
Norwegian pentathletes
Olympic athletes of Norway
Athletes (track and field) at the 1952 Summer Olympics
Norwegian female speed skaters
Sportspeople from Innlandet